The 1897 Wimbledon Championships was a tennis tournament that took place on the outdoor grass courts at the All England Lawn Tennis Club in Wimbledon, London, United Kingdom. The tournament ran from 21 June until 1 July. It was the 21st staging of the Wimbledon Championships, and the first Grand Slam tennis event of 1897. No matches were played on the first Tuesday to mark Queen Victoria's jubilee. Reginald Doherty defeated Harold Mahony in the Challenge Round, and successfully defended his title for the next three years.

Champions

Men's singles

 Reginald Doherty defeated  Harold Mahony, 6–4, 6–4, 6–3

Women's singles

 Blanche Hillyard defeated  Charlotte Cooper, 5–7, 7–5, 6–2

Men's doubles

 Laurence Doherty /  Reginald Doherty defeated  Herbert Baddeley /  Wilfred Baddeley, 6–4, 4–6, 8–6, 6–4

References

External links
 Official Wimbledon Championships website

 
Wimbledon Championships
Wimbledon Championships
Wimbledon Championships
Wimbledon Championships
Wimbledon Championships